Webuye Constituency was an electoral constituency in Kenya. It was one of five constituencies in Bungoma District. The constituency was established for the 1988 elections. It has since been divided into Webuye East Constituency and Webuye West Constituency.

Members of Parliament

Wards

References

Bungoma County
Constituencies of Western Province (Kenya)
1988 establishments in Kenya
Constituencies established in 1988
Former constituencies of Kenya